Bailey Road railway station is a small railway station in Patna district, Bihar. Its code is BRHT. It serves Patna city. The station consists of 1 platforms.

References

External links 

 Official website of the Patna district

Railway stations in Patna
Railway stations in Patna district
Danapur railway division